Utricularia spiralis is a medium to large-sized, probably perennial carnivorous plant that belongs to the genus Utricularia. It is endemic to tropical Africa and can be found in Angola, Burundi, Chad, Côte d'Ivoire, the Democratic Republic of the Congo, Gabon, Guinea, Liberia, Malawi, Sierra Leone, Tanzania, and Zambia. It was originally described by James Edward Smith in 1819.

See also 
 List of Utricularia species

References

External links 
  Utricularia spiralis in Brunken, U., Schmidt, M., Dressler, S., Janssen, T., Thiombiano, A. & Zizka, G. 2008. West African plants - A Photo Guide. www.westafricanplants.senckenberg.de.

Carnivorous plants of Africa
Flora of Angola
Flora of Burundi
Flora of Chad
Flora of Ivory Coast
Flora of Gabon
Flora of Guinea
Flora of Liberia
Flora of Malawi
Flora of Sierra Leone
Flora of Tanzania
Flora of the Democratic Republic of the Congo
Flora of Zambia
spiralis
Plants described in 1819